GURT may refer to:
 Genetic Use Restriction Technology, proposed methods for restricting the use of genetically modified plants
 Giant Ukrainian Radio Telescope, a low-frequency radio telescope in Kharkiv oblast, Ukraine

See also
Gogurt
Yogurt (disambiguation)
Yurt (disambiguation)